Darren Cheesman (born 23 February 1986 in Hackney, London) is an ex-England and Great Britain Hockey field hockey International who is now a High Performance Coach for England Hockey and FIH, as well as a Coach Educator for FIH.

Life

As well as previously being a member of the England and Great Britain Hockey Teams, he was also a member of the Great Britain U21 team that won Silver Medal at the 2007 Junior Olympic Games in Sydney, Australia.

The Midfielder / Forward plays club hockey at Southgate, after spells at Reading, East Grinstead and Old Loughtonians.

 After playing in the 2005 Junior World Cup, Cheesman was signed by Oranje Zwart, a Premier League club in Netherlands. He spent a year there playing with and against the best players in the world. During his first spell at East Grinstead, Cheesman was voted 'Premier League Player of the Year'. Cheesman played an instrumental role in East Grinstead's successes both domestically and in the Euro Hockey League.

Cheesman came into hockey through Arsenal FC's 'Sport in the Community' programme. It is a programme that sees the football club send coaches into local schools and communities to teach them various sports. Cheesman attended Arsenal's 'in the community' scheme and gained opportunities and life skills that have helped him reach his position today.

He became Muslim in 2007 after reading a copy of Islam for Dummies in Waterstones.

References

English male field hockey players
English people of Jamaican descent
Black British sportsmen
People from the London Borough of Hackney
Living people
Converts to Islam
English Sunni Muslims
1986 births
East Grinstead Hockey Club players
Reading Hockey Club players
Southgate Hockey Club players